"À l'heure où je me couche" is a song by French hip hop duo Casseurs Flowters and produced by Skread. It was released on 29 October 2015 as the first single from their second studio album Comment c'est loin, which also serves as the soundtrack for their 2015 film of the same name. The song entered the French Singles Chart on 31 October 2015 at number 126, peaking at number 34 and remaining on the chart for 14 weeks.

In the song, Orelsan sings that «l'avenir appartient à ceux qui se lèvent à l'heure où je me couche» ("the future belongs to those who wake up when I go to sleep"), which is a reference to the French proverb «L'avenir appartient à ceux qui se lèvent tôt» (roughly translated as "the early bird catches the worm"). The line suggests that he and Gringe have no futures, because they go to bed so late (at a time when one would usually be waking up).

Music video
The music video for the song was released worldwide on 5 November 2015. It features shots of Orelsan and Gringe rapping to the words of the song blended with clips from the film Comment c'est loin through chroma keying.

Track listing
 Digital download
 "À l'heure où je me couche" – 3:37

Chart performance

Certifications

References

2015 singles
2015 songs
Orelsan songs
Casseurs Flowters songs
French hip hop songs
Alternative hip hop songs
7th Magnitude singles
Wagram Music singles
Songs written by Gringe
Songs written by Orelsan
Song recordings produced by Skread